Miss Polski 2017 was the 28th Miss Polski pageant, held on December 3, 2017. The winner was Kamila Świerc of Opole. Świerc then represented Poland at Miss Supranational 2019. The 1st Runner-Up, Marta Ziębakowska represented the country at Miss International 2018.

Final results

Special Awards

Finalists

Notes

Withdrawals
 Holy Cross
 Lubusz

Did not compete
 Lower Silesia
 West Pomerania
 Polish Community in Argentina
 Polish Community in Australia
 Polish Community in Belarus
 Polish Community in Brazil
 Polish Community in Canada
 Polish Community in France
 Polish Community in Germany
 Polish Community in Ireland
 Polish Community in Israel
 Polish Community in Lithuania
 Polish Community in Russia
 Polish Community in South Africa
 Polish Community in Sweden
 Polish Community in the U.S.
 Polish Community in Venezuela

References

External links
Official Website

2017
2017 beauty pageants
2017 in Poland